Fakahatchee Strand State Preserve is a Florida State Park just west of Copeland, Florida. It is located in the Fakahatchee Strand, a thread of forested strand (swamp) in Big Cypress, a section of the Florida Everglades off SR 29.

Flora
Plants found in the park include royal palm, bald cypress, bromeliads, ferns, and orchids.

Fauna
Among the wildlife of the park are a number of threatened and endangered species: the Florida panther, wood stork, black bear, fox squirrel, and Everglades mink. The park also is home to white-tailed deer, raccoons, opossums, red-shouldered hawks, wild turkeys, owls, and vultures. Alligators, ducks, sandhill cranes, roseate spoonbills, bald eagles, and osprey can be seen in the park.

Recreational activities
Activities include plant and wildlife viewing. Amenities include Janes Scenic Drive, an 11–mile–long unpaved, gravel road, a 2,000 foot boardwalk and guided tours.

Hours
Florida state parks are open between 8 a.m. and sundown every day of the year (including holidays).

Popular culture
The swamp, home of the rare Ghost Orchid (Dendrophylax lindenii), was featured in the novel The Orchid Thief by Susan Orlean. The book was the source for Charlie Kaufman's screenplay for the movie Adaptation. 

The swamp is featured in an episode of The Finder, where the series protagonist Walter Sherman looks for a missing pilot who disappeared under mysterious circumstances.  The pilot's remains and plane were found in the Fakahatchee.

References

External links
Fakahatchee Strand Preserve State Park at Florida State Parks
Fakahatchee Strand Preserve State Park at Absolutely Florida

State parks of Florida
Parks in Collier County, Florida
Everglades